Edward Joseph Kelly (May 1, 1876October 20, 1950) was an American politician who served as the 46th Mayor of Chicago from April 17, 1933 until April 15, 1947. 

Prior to being mayor of Chicago, Kelly served as chief engineer of the Chicago Sanitary District during the 1920s.

Early life and career
Born to Stephen, a police officer and Helen (née Lang) Kelly, he was the first of five Chicago mayors from Bridgeport of Chicago's South Side. He did not complete grammar school but entered the labor force at age ten.

Kelly was the chief engineer of the Chicago Sanitary District in the 1920s. He was sponsored by Patrick Nash, the owner of a sewer-contracting company that did millions of dollars of business with the city.

Political career

President of the South Park Commission
In March 1924, Kelly became president of the South Park Commission. Upon his election he declared the end to an era of "Deenen Republicans", a faction of South Side Republicans allied with Robert R. McCormick which had lost control of the South Park Commission in the March 1924 municipal elections.

He presided over the completion and opening of Soldier Field, which was built and operated by the South Park Commission.

Kelly organized many public ceremonies and events hosted by the venue. He made the venue the site of fundraisers and other events for charities and organizations which were supported by the Democratic Party.

Mayor of Chicago (1933–1947)

Following the assassination of Mayor Anton Cermak, Kelly was hand-picked by his friend, Patrick Nash, Chairman of the Cook County Democratic Party, to be the Democratic-backed candidate in the City Council's vote on a successor for Cermak. Together, Kelly and Nash built one of the most powerful, and most corrupt, big city political organizations, called the "Kelly-Nash Machine".

Kelly was Mayor of Chicago during the 1933–34 Chicago World's Fair (Century of Progress) which took place during the Great Depression which included the successful playing of the first official Major League Baseball All-Star Game; Kelly initiated for holding a major sport event for the fair to the Chicago Tribune. Kelly was famous for banning Nelson Algren's 1942 book Never Come Morning, a novel, from the Chicago Public Library; the ban remained in force for decades due to the outcry by Chicago Polonia upon its release.

From 1945 until 1947, Kelly served as president of the United States Conference of Mayors.

In 1937, the city received a grant and loan from the Works Progress Administration to begin construction on subways, with a groundbreaking being held December 17, 1938 for the city's first subway. The WPA funding would only partially cover the total cost of the subway (ultimately working out to 3/4 of the total cost). Kelly was also able to obtain WPA financing for projects such as a refurbishment of Midway Airport and roadway improvements.

In 1945, the National Education Association released a report on Chicago Public Schools that issued deep condemnation of the pollicization of its administration and of unethical practices by its leadership. In response to this, in March 1946, North Central Association of Colleges and Secondary Schools threatened  to revoke its accreditation of the city public high school. On April 1, 1946, Mayor Kelly created an advisory committee to address the problems in the Chicago Public Schools. The committee was led by Henry Townley Heald, and  Kelly pledged that he would follow the recommendations that the committee would issue. The committee approved a majority decision on June 18, 1946 which made recommendations to change the laws dictating the administration of Chicago Public School and called for the resignations superintendent of Chicago Public Schools William Johnson and the entirety of the Chicago Board of Education. Kelly accepted all of the recommendations of the committee except their recommendation that the entire school board resign. However, in the wake of this controversy, many school board members did resign. The individuals to fill the vacancies were selected through recommendations issued by the advisory committee led by Heald. Ultimately, McCahey would retire from the board in May 1947. Kelly's successor, Martin Kennelly, would keep the practice of having a screening committee recommend individuals to be appointed to the Chicago Board of Education.

During Kelly's tenure, the city was finally able to unify public transit with the establishment of the Chicago Transit Authority.

End of tenure
In 1947, Kelly acquiesced to the Cook County Democratic Party's decision to slate a candidate with reform credentials for mayor of Chicago, and was succeeded by Martin H. Kennelly.

Kelly was serving as Democratic National Committeeman from Illinois at the time of his death.

Death
Kelly died in 1950 at age 74 and was interred in Calvary Cemetery in Evanston, Illinois.

See also
Timeline of Chicago, 1930s-1940s

References

1876 births
1950 deaths
Burials at Calvary Cemetery (Evanston, Illinois)
Catholics from Illinois
Illinois Democrats
Mayors of Chicago
Presidents of the United States Conference of Mayors